Michael Byrne (born 14 January 1960 in Dublin) was an Irish football player during the 1970s, 1980s and 1990s.

Playing career
He made his Bohs debut in the 1979 FAI League Cup final win over Shamrock Rovers on 22 March 1979. He made his League of Ireland debut three days later.

He had a spell at Shelbourne, where he was Player of the Month in February 1982.

He attracted the interest of Manchester City during his time at Shels.

Byrne signed for Shamrock Rovers in the summer of 1984.

In each of his three seasons at Milltown, he won the domestic double as well as represented the League in the Olympic qualifiers. He was the top scorer in the 1986–87 League of Ireland Premier Division season  and made 6 appearances in European competition. Transfer talks with AS Saint-Étienne and Feyenoord didn't work out so after 72 goals in 146 games, in January 1988 Mick signed for FC Den Haag thus ending an extraordinarily successful period at Rovers.

He briefly re-signed for Rovers again in July 1988 but after 3 goals in 6 games he left for Huddersfield Town A.F.C. the following month for £20,000. After two seasons in which he scored 11 goals in 56 league games, he came back to Rovers for the club's first season in the RDS but left in January 1991 after 5 goals in 20 appearances for Sligo Rovers as the club had an abundance of strikers. At Sligo, he scored 6 goals in 34 total appearances, 27 in the league.

During his time at Rovers, he scored 46 league goals and 10 goals in the FAI Cup. He also played in 3 1988 Summer Olympics qualifiers, scoring twice.

He had two more spells at Shels and also represented Dundalk F.C., Monaghan United, St. James's Gate F.C. (one game) and Athlone Town during his career. With Monaghan he finished as the 1992–93 League of Ireland First Division top scorer and his 15 league goals helped them gain promotion.

He was Rovers top goalscorer in 1984/85, 1986/87 and 1987/88 and made 5 appearances in Europe.

At the end of the 2012 League of Ireland season Byrne is joint twenty seventh in the all-time League of Ireland goalscoring list with 117 league goals

Management career
In 1996, he managed St. James's Gate F.C. for two games, playing once, before their resignation from the league. He then returned to Rovers as assistant manager to Pat Byrne before taking over as the manager for the 1997/98 season. In his first season in charge he guided the club to a win in Europe but his second season ended badly as Rovers finished 8th. He was replaced by Damien Richardson.

Honours

Club
Shamrock Rovers
League of Ireland: 3
 1984/85, 1985/86, 1986/87
FAI Cup: 3
 1985, 1986, 1987
LFA President's Cup: 
 1984/85
Bohemians 
League of Ireland Cup: 1
 1979
Leinster Senior Cup: 1
 1979/80

Individual
PFAI Player of the Year: 1
 1986/87
SWAI Personality of the Year: 1
 1986/87
SRFC Player of the Year: 1
 1987/88

References

1960 births
Living people
Bohemian F.C. players
Shelbourne F.C. players
Republic of Ireland association footballers
Republic of Ireland expatriate association footballers
Association football forwards
ADO Den Haag players
Eredivisie players
Shamrock Rovers F.C. players
Huddersfield Town A.F.C. players
English Football League players
League of Ireland players
League of Ireland managers
Dundalk F.C. players
Sligo Rovers F.C. players
Athlone Town A.F.C. players
Shamrock Rovers F.C. managers
League of Ireland XI players
St James's Gate F.C. players
St James's Gate F.C. managers
Monaghan United F.C. players
Republic of Ireland football managers